Ivan Shavel (born 13 July 2001) is a Belarusian professional footballer who plays for BGU Minsk.

References

External links 
 
 

2001 births
Living people
Belarusian footballers
Association football defenders
FC Minsk players
FC Smolevichi players